McAlister is a northern Irish and Scottish surname.

McAlister may also refer to:

 McAlister Field House
 McAlister Place, New Orleans
 McAlister's Deli

See also
McAllister (disambiguation)
McAlester (disambiguation)